Schnaudertal is a municipality in the Burgenlandkreis district, in Saxony-Anhalt, Germany. It was formed on 1 January 2010 by the merger of the former municipalities Bröckau and Wittgendorf.

References

Burgenlandkreis